Oregon Route 351 (OR 351) is an Oregon state highway running from Joseph to Wallowa Lake State Park. OR 351 is known as the Joseph-Wallowa Lake Highway No. 351 (see Oregon highways and routes).

OR 351 was established in 2003 as part of Oregon's project to assign route numbers to highways that previously were not assigned, and, as of July 2017, was unsigned.

Route description 

OR 351 begins at an intersection with OR 82 and OR 350 in Joseph and heads south past Wallowa Lake through Wallowa Lake State Park, ending  past the southern boundary of the park.

History 

OR 351 was assigned to the Joseph-Wallowa Lake Highway in 2003.  This section of highway was originally part of OR 82.

Major intersections

References 
 Oregon Department of Transportation, Descriptions of US and Oregon Routes, https://web.archive.org/web/20051102084300/http://www.oregon.gov/ODOT/HWY/TRAFFIC/TEOS_Publications/PDF/Descriptions_of_US_and_Oregon_Routes.pdf, page 30.
 Oregon Department of Transportation, Joseph-Wallowa Lake Highway No. 351, ftp://ftp.odot.state.or.us/tdb/trandata/maps/slchart_pdfs_1980_to_2002/Hwy351_1996.pdf

351
Transportation in Wallowa County, Oregon
Joseph, Oregon